Pantherophis bairdi is a species of harmless snake in the family Colubridae. The species is native to the southwestern United States and adjacent northeastern Mexico. No subspecies are recognized as being valid.

Geographic range and habitat
P. bairdi is found in the United States in the Big Bend region of western Texas, as well as in northern Mexico in the Mexican states of Coahuila, Nuevo León, and Tamaulipas. It is known to be elusive and hard to find in the wild. 

P. bairdi prefers semi-arid, rocky habitats.

Etymology and common names
The specific name, bairdi, as well as several of the common names, are in honor of American zoologist Spencer Fullerton Baird.

Common names include: Baird's rat snake, Baird's ratsnake, Baird's pilot snake, Baird's Coluber, and Great Bend rat snake.

Description

Adults of P. bairdi may reach  in total length (including tail). The dorsal color pattern consists of an orange-yellow to bright yellow, or a darker salmon ground color, overlaid with four stripes that run from the neck to the tail. The belly is generally gray to yellow, darkening near the tail.

Biology
The primary diet of P. bairdi consists of rodents, although it will also prey on birds. Juveniles often eat lizards.

Baird's rat snake is typically more pleasantly tempered than other rat snake species.

P. bairdi is oviparous. Adult females may lay a clutch of up to 10 eggs that take about 3 months to hatch.

Taxonomy
Pantherophis bairdi has sometimes been considered a subspecies of Pantherophis obsoletus, to which it is closely related. Pantherophis bairdi has often been placed in the genus Elaphe, but recent phylogenetic analyses have resulted in its transfer to the genus Pantherophis.

References

Further reading
Behler JL, King FW (1979). The Audubon Society Field Guide to North American Reptiles and Amphibians. New York: Knopf. 743 pp. . (Elaphe obsoleta bairdi, p. 606 + Plate 509).
Collins JT, Taggart TW (2008). "An alternative classification of the New World Rat Snakes (genus Pantherophis [Reptilia: Squamata: Colubridae])". Journal of Kansas Herpetology 26: 16-18.
Conant R (1975). A Field Guide to Reptiles and Amphibians of Eastern and Central North America, Second Edition. Boston: Houghton Mifflin. xviii + 429 pp. + Plates 1-48.  (hardcover),  (paperback). (Elaphe obsoleta bairdi, p. 196 + Plate 28 + Map 149).
Powell R, Conant R, Collins JT (2016). Peterson Field Guide to Reptiles and Amphibians of Eastern and Central North America, Fourth Edition. Boston and New York: Houghton Mifflin Harcourt. xiv + 494 pp. . (Pantherophis bairdi, pp. 384–386, Figure 180 + Plate 36, Figure 161). 
Schmidt KP, Davis DD (1941). Field Book of Snakes of the United States and Canada. New York: G.P. Putnam's Sons. 365 pp. (Elaphe bairdi, pp. 144–145, Figure 38).
Smith HM, Brodie ED Jr (1982). Reptiles of North America: A Guide to Field Identification. New York: Golden Press. 240 pp. . (Elaphe obsoleta bairdi, p. 184).
Stejneger L, Barbour T (1917). A Check List of North American Amphibians and Reptiles. Cambridge, Massachusetts: Harvard University Press. 125 pp. (Elaphe bairdi, p. 82).
Yarrow HC (1880). In: Cope ED (1880). "On the Zoological Position of Texas". Bulletin of the United States National Museum (17): 1-51. (Coluber bairdi, new species, p. 41).

External links

 Elaphe bairdi  at Herps of Texas . Accessed 29 November 2008.
 Elaphe bairdi at Bowling Green State University Herp Lab. Accessed 29 November 2008.

Colubrids
Reptiles of the United States
Reptiles of Mexico
Reptiles described in 1880
Taxa named by Henry Crécy Yarrow